Ballygomartin Road is a cricket ground in the Greater Shankill area of Belfast, Northern Ireland and the home of Woodvale Cricket Club. The ground has hosted a single List-A match which saw Canada play Namibia in the 2005 ICC Trophy.

References

External links
Ballygomartin Road on CricketArchive
Ballygomartin Road on Cricinfo

Cricket grounds in Northern Ireland
Sports venues in Belfast